Ottoman Tunisia, refers to the Turkish presence in Ifriqiya from the 16th century to the 18th century, when Tunis was officially integrated into the Ottoman Empire as the Eyalet of Tunis. Eventually including all of the Maghrib except Morocco, the Ottoman Empire began with the takeover of Algiers in 1516 by the Ottoman Turkish corsair and beylerbey Oruç Reis. The first Ottoman conquest of Tunis took place in 1534 under the command of Barbarossa Hayreddin Pasha, the younger brother of Oruç Reis, who was the Kapudan Pasha of the Ottoman Fleet during the reign of Suleiman the Magnificent. However, it wasn't until the final Ottoman reconquest of Tunis from Spain in 1574 under Kapudan Pasha Uluç Ali Reis that the Turks permanently acquired the former Hafsid Tunisia, retaining it until the French occupation of Tunisia in 1881.

Tunis was initially under Turkish rule from Algiers, but the Ottoman Porte soon directly appointed a governor (pasha) supported by janissary forces. Before long however, Tunisia in effect became an autonomous province, under the local bey. This change of status was from time to time challenged by Algiers, without success. During this era the governing councils controlling Tunisia remained largely composed of a foreign elite who continued to conduct state business in the Ottoman Turkish language.

Barbary pirates attacked European shipping, primarily from Algiers, but also from Tunis and Tripoli, yet after a long period of declining raids, the growing power of the European states finally forced an end to the practice after the Barbary Wars. Under the Ottoman Empire, the boundaries of Tunisia contracted; it lost territory to the west ( Constantine) and to the east (Tripoli). In the 19th century, the rulers of Tunisia became aware of the ongoing efforts at political and social reform in the Ottoman capital. The Bey of Tunis then, by his own lights but informed by the Turkish example, attempted a modernizing reform of institutions and the economy. Tunisian international debt grew unmanageable. This was the reason or pretext for French forces to establish a Protectorate in 1881.

A remnant of the centuries of Turkish rule is the presence of a population of Turkish origin. Historically the male descendants were referred to as the Kouloughlis.

Mediterranean rivalry

In the 16th century, control of the western Mediterranean was contested between the Spaniards and the Turks. Both were confident due to recent triumphs and subsequent expansion. In 1492, Spain had completed her centuries-long reconquista of the Iberian peninsula, which was followed by the first Spanish settlements in America. Spain then formulated an African policy: a series of presidios in port cities along the African coast. For their part, the Ottoman Turks had fulfilled their long-term ambition of capturing Constantinople in 1453, then successfully invaded further into the Balkans (1459–1482), and later conquered Syria and Egypt (1516–1517).

Turkish Barbary corsairs became active from bases in the Maghrib. Spain captured and occupied several ports in North Africa, including Mers-el-Kebir (1505), Oran (1509), Tripoli (1510), and Bougie (1510). Spain also established treaty relations with a half dozen others. These agreements included one with Algiers (1510), which provided Spanish occupation of the off-shore island Peñón de Argel. Spain also reached agreements with Tlemcen (1511), a city about 40 km. inland, and with Tunis, whose Spanish alliance lasted on and off for decades. Near Tunis, the port of Goletta was later occupied by Spanish forces who built a large and strong presidio there. They also constructed an  aqueduct to Tunis for use by the kasbah.

The Hafsid dynasty had since 1227 ruled Tunisia, enjoying prestige when it was the leading state of the Maghrib, or barely surviving in ill-favored times. Extensive trade with European merchants continued over some centuries, an activity which led to state treaties. Yet the Hafsids also harbored corsairs who raided merchant shipping. During the 15th century the Hafsids employed as bodyguards a Christian force of hundreds, nearly all Catalans. In the 16th century the Hafsid rule grew weak, often limited to Tunis. The last three Hafsid sultans, al-Hasan, his son Ahmad, and his brother Muhammad, made inconsistent treaties with Spain.

Yet the cross-cultural Hafsid alliance with Spain was not as unusual as it might seem, given the many Muslim-Christian treaties, despite recurrent hostilities. Indeed, during the early 16th century, France allied with the Ottomans against the Spanish King Carlos. As an indirect result of Spain's Africa policy, a few Muslim rulers encouraged Turkish forces to enter the region to counter the Spanish presence. Yet the Hafsid rulers of Tunis came to see the Turks and their corsair allies as a greater threat and entered an alliance with the Spanish, as also did the Sa'dids of Morocco. Nonetheless many Maghriban Muslims strongly preferred Islamic rule, and the Hafsid's decades-long Spanish alliance was not generally popular, and was indeed anathema to some. On the other hand, the Saadi dynasty sultans of Morocco successfully played off Iberian against Turk, thus managing to remain both Muslim-ruled and independent of the Ottoman grasp.

In this naval struggle, the Ottoman Empire supported many Barbary corsairs, who raided European commercial shipping in the Mediterranean. The corsairs later would make Algiers their principal base. The "architects of Ottoman rule in the Maghrib" were Aruj [Oruç] (c.1474–1518) and his younger brother Khizr "Khayr al-Din" [Arabic epithet] (c.1483–1546). Both were called Barbarossa ("red beard"). The Muslim brothers hailed from obscure origins in the Greek island of Medelli or Mytilene [ancient Lesbos].

After acquiring fighting experience in the eastern Mediterranean (during which Aruj was captured and spent three years at oars in a galley of the Knights of St. John before being ransomed), the two brothers arrived in Tunis as corsair leaders. By 1504 they had entered into a privateer agreement with the Hafsid sultan Mohammad b. al-Hasan (1493–1526). Under the agreement the 'prizes' (ships, cargoes, and captives) were to be shared. The brothers operated from Goletta]] [Halq al Wadi]; they ran similar operations from Djerba in the south, where Aruj was governor. During these years in Spain, those who remained non-Christian were required to leave, including Muslims; at times Aruj employed his ships to transport many Moorish Andalucians to North Africa, especially Tunisia. For these efforts Aruj won praise and many Muslim recruits. Twice Aruj joined the Hafsids in unsuccessful assaults on Bougie, held by Spain. Then the brothers set up an independent base in Djidjelli, east of Bougie, which attracted Hafsid hostility.

In 1516 Aruj and his brother Khayr al-Din, accompanied by Turkish soldiers, moved further west to Algiers, where he managed to wrestle control away from the shaykh of the Tha'aliba tribe, who had treatied with Spain. By political cunning, in which the tribal chief and later 22 notables were killed, control of Algiers passed to the Barbarossa brothers. The Turkish brothers were already Ottoman allies. Yet in 1518 when Aruj led an attack against Tlemcen, then held by a Spanish ally (since 1511), Aruj was killed by Muslim tribal forces and the Spanish.

His younger brother Khayr al-Din inherited control of Algiers, but left that city and for some years was based to its east. After returning to Algiers, in 1529 he captured from Spain the offshore island Peñón de Argel whose guns had controlled the port; by constructing a causeway joining these islands he created an excellent harbor for the city. Khayr al-Din continued to direct large-scale raids on Christian shipping and against the coastlands of Mediterranean Europe, seizing much wealth and taking many captives. He won several naval battles and became a celebrity. In 1533 Khayr al-Din was called to Constantinople where the Ottoman sultan made him Pasha and the admiral [Kapudan-i Derya] of the Turkish navy; he acquired control over many more ships and soldiers. In 1534 Khayr al-Din "taking advantage of a revolt against the Hafsid al-Hasan" invaded by sea and captured the city of Tunis from Spain's allies.

Yet the following year the Emperor Charles V (Carlos, Rey de España) (r.1516–1556) organized a fleet under Andrea Doria of Genoa, composed predominantly of Italians, Germans, and Spaniards, which recaptured Tunis in 1535, following which the Hafsid sultan Mawlay Hasan was reinstated.
 Yet Khayr al-Din escaped. Thereafter, as supreme commander of Ottoman naval forces for the Ottoman Empire, Khayr al-Din was largely preoccupied with affairs outside the Maghrib.

A few decades passed until in 1556 another Turkish corsair Dragut (Turgut), ruling in Tripoli, attacked Tunisia from the east, entering Kairouan in 1558. Then in 1569 Uluj Ali Pasha, a renegade corsair, now the successor to Khayr al-Din as the Beylerbey of Algiers, advanced with Turkish forces from the west, and managed to seize the Spanish presidio Goletta and the Hafsid capital, Tunis. After the key naval victory of the Christian armada at Lepanto in 1571, Don Juan de Austria in 1573 retook Tunis for Spain, restoring Hafsid rule. Yet Uluj Ali returned in 1574 with a large fleet and army, and captured Tunis with finality. To the Turkish sultan he then sent by ship, imprisoned, the last ruler of the Hafsid dynasty.

The Spanish-Ottoman truce of 1581 quieted the Mediterranean rivalry between these two world powers. Spain kept a few of its Maghriban presidios and ports (e.g., Melilla and Oran). Yet both the Spanish and Ottoman Empires had become preoccupied elsewhere. The Ottomans would claim suzerainty over Tunisia for the next three centuries; however, its effective political control in the Maghrib would prove to be of short duration.

Ottomans in the West
Absent the entry of the Turks into the western Mediterranean, the political situation favored the Christian north. In overall strength, the various European powers led by Spain continued to increase their lead. Among the local Maghriban states in comparison, business was in decline and their governments weak and divided. The long-term future seemed to present the possibility, or probability, of an eventual 'reconquest' of North Africa from the north. Accordingly, the intervention by another rising foreign power, co-religionists from the east, namely the well-armed Ottoman Turks, appeared crucial. It tipped the scales in the Maghrib, allowing for several centuries of continued rule by the older Muslim institutions, as redone by the Turks. Furthermore, the successful but questionable tactic of corsairs raiding European commercial shipping fit well enough into the Mediterranean strategy pursued by the Ottoman Porte at Constantinople.

"Turkey was frequently combated by native North African rulers, and never gained any hold over Morocco. But the Turks were none the less a powerful ally for Barbary, diverting Christian energies into eastern Europe, threatening Mediterranean communications, and absorbing those forces which might otherwise have turned their attention to reconquest in Africa."

So for the first time the Ottomans entered into the Maghrib, eventually establishing their governing authority, at least indirectly, along most of the southern coast of the Mediterranean. During the 16th and subsequent centuries their empire was widely recognized as the leading Muslim state in the world: Islam's primary focus. The Ottoman Empire was "the leader of all Islam for nearly half a millennium." The Turkish sultan became the caliph.

This Ottoman contact enriched Tunisia with its distinctive Islamic culture and institutions, which differed markedly from the familiar Arab world. For more than half a millennium Islamic doctrines had filtered through Turkish experience, whose ethnic origin lay in Central Asia, resulting in unique developments, and new perspectives. For example, Turks wrote their own gazi sagas of frontier warfare, no doubt following Islamic traditions of early Arab conquests, yet informed by legends of their own derived from life on the steppes of Central Asia. Due to the exigencies of rule, and its large geographic jurisdiction, the Ottoman state took the lead in Muslim legal developments for some centuries. Sources of imperial law included not only Islamic fiqh, and inherited Roman-Byzantine codes, but also "the traditions of the great Turkish and Mongol empires of Central Asia". The Turkish jurist Ebu us-Suud Efendi (c.1490–1574) was credited with the harmonization for use in Ottoman courts of the qanun (regulations of the secular state) and the şeriat (sacred law).

Ottoman popular literature and much of the learning of its elites was expressed in the Turkish language. Turkish became the idiom for state business in Tunisia and its unique flavors percolated throughout Tunisian society. After Arabic and Persian, it is the third language of Islam and for centuries has "played a very important role in the intellectual life" of Muslim culture. In addition, the Turks brought their popular customs, such as their music, clothing, and the coffee house (kahvehane or "kiva han").

The new energy of Turkish rule was welcome in Tunis and other cities, and the regime's stability appreciated by the clerical ulama. Although the Ottomans preferred the Hanifi school of law, some Tunisian Maliki jurists were admitted into administrative and judicial positions. Yet the rule remained one of a foreign elite. In the countryside, efficient Turkish troops managed to control the tribes without compromising alliances, but their rule was unpopular. "Ottomans' military prowess enable them to curb the tribes rather than placate them. An image of Turkish domination and Tunisian subordination emerged everywhere." The rural economy was never brought under effective regulation by the central authority. For revenues the government continued to rely primarily on Barbary corsair raids against shipping in the Mediterranean, an activity then more 'profitable' than trade. With a Spanish-Ottoman accord in 1581 Spain's attention turned away and corsair activity increased. Yet peaceful trade and commerce suffered.

Introduction into Tunisia of a Turkish-speaking ruling caste, whose institutions dominated governance for centuries, indirectly affected the lingering divide between Berber and Arabic in the settled areas. This bipolarity of linguistic culture had been reactivated by the 11th-century invasion of the rebellious Arabic-speaking Banu Hilal. Subsequently, Arabic had gained the ascendancy, and use of Berber had been thereafter gradually eroding. Then this assertive presence of a Turkish-speaking elite seemed to hasten the submergence of Berber speech in Tunisia.

Pasha role in Tunis
After Tunisia's fall to the Ottoman Empire, a pasha was eventually appointed by the Porte. "Pasha" (Trk: paşa: "head, chief") is Ottoman imperial nomenclature indicating a high office, a holder of civil and/or military authority, e.g., the governor over a province. During its first few years under the Ottomans, however, Tunisia was ruled from the city of Algiers by a corsair leader who held the Ottoman title beylerbey (Trk: "bey of beys" from Turkish beğ: "gazi commander"].

When armed forces loyal to the Ottomans began arriving in the Maghrib, its coastal regions, particularly in Algeria, were in political disarray and fragmented. One of its quasi-independent sea ports Algiers [ancient Ikosim] became among the first to fall under permanent Turkish control (in 1516). Its early capture gave Algiers some claim to primacy within the expanding Turkish Empire. It was only under the Ottomans that Algiers became a favored city. Previously, Algiers had not been particularly significant and for the most part had long lain in the shadows of Tunis to its east and Tlemcen to its west.<ref>I. Hrbek, "The disintegration of political unity in the Maghrib" 34–43, at 36, in General History of Africa, volume IV (1988, 1997), edited by J. Ki-Zerbo and D. T. Niani. "The three dynasties which now ruled in the Maghrib were the Hafsids (1228–1574) in Tunis, the 'Abd al-Wadids or Zayyanids (1235–1554) in Tlemcen, and the Marinids (c.1230–1472) in Morocco."</ref>

Tunisia lost control in the 1520s over Constantine. The area was historically within Hafsid domains, but fell to attacks led by the beylerbey Khayr al-Din of Algiers. Later Tunisia also lost Tripoli (Tarabulus, in present-day Libya), ruled by another Turkish corsair, the renegade Dragut or Turgut Reis (1551).Abun-Nasr, A History of North Africa (1971) at 175, 177 (Constantine); at 193 (Tripoli [Tarabulus]).

In 1518 the younger Barbarossa Khayr al-Din became the first Ottoman beylerbey in Algiers. His rule was autocratic, without the moderating advice of a council (diwan). As beylerbey he captured Tunis in 1534, holding it only a year. In 1536 Khayr al-Din left the Maghrib, promoted to command the Ottoman fleets. Four beylerbeys in succession (1536–1568) then ruled in Algiers and over areas of North Africa fallen to Ottoman control.In 1556 the janissaries of Algiers unsuccessfully "tried to have their popular agha, Hasan Qusru, appointed beylerbey." Abun-Nasr, A History of the Maghrib (1971) at 173. The renegade corsair Uluj Ali (1519–1587) was appointed Pasha of Algiers and its last Beylerbey in 1568; the Porte instructed him to capture Tunis. He was perhaps "with Khayr al-Din the greatest figure in Turkish rule" of the Maghrib. In 1569 Uluj Ali took Tunis, holding it four years, yet in 1574 he again took possession of the city. Tunis thereafter remained under the beylerbey in Algiers, Uluj Ali, until his death in 1587. The office was then abolished.

Perhaps due in part to these few brief periods of Algerian rule over Tunis in the early Ottoman era, later Turkish rulers in Algiers more than once tried to exercise control over Tunisian affairs by force, e.g., during intra-dynasty conflicts. Yet eventually such interference by Algiers was each time checked.Abun-Nasr, A History of North Africa (1971) at 166, 173–174, and 179–180, 181–182.Cherif, "Algeria, Tunisia, and Libya: the Ottomans and their heirs" 120–133, at 131, in General History of Africa, volume V (UNESCO 1992, 1999), edited by B. A. Ogot. Cherif notes that the Algerians profited by their armed incursions into Tunisia.

The beylerbey had "exercised the authority of suzerain in the name of the Ottoman sultan over [Tunis]. [The beylerbey] was the supreme Ottoman authority in the western Mediterranean, and responsible for conducting the war against the Christian enemies of the empire... ." When Uluj Ali died, the Turkish sultan discontinued the office, in effect normalizing the administration of the Maghriban provinces in acknowledgement of an end to the long struggle with Spain. In its place, for each province (present day Algeria, Libya, Tunisia, the office of pasha was established to oversee provincial government.Spencer, Algiers in the Age of the Corsairs (1976) at 119.

Thus in 1587 a pasha became Ottoman governor of Tunisia. Under the Pasha served a bey, among whose duties was the collection of state revenue. From 1574 to 1591 a council (the Diwan), composed of senior Turkish military (Trk: buluk-bashis) and local notables, advised the pasha. The language used remained Turkish. With permanent Ottoman rule (imposed in 1574) the government of Tunis acquired some stability. The prior period had been made insecure and uncertain by the fortunes of war.M. H. Cherif, "Algeria, Tunisia, and Libya: The Ottomans and their heirs", 120–133, at 124, in General History of Africa, volume V: Africa from the Sixteenth to the Eighteenth Century (UNESCO 1992, 1999).

Yet the new Ottoman Pasha's grip on power in Tunisia was if anything of short duration. Four years later, in 1591 a revolt within the ranks of the occupying Turkish forces (the janissaires) thrust forward a new military commander, the dey, who effectively took the pasha's place and became the ruling authority in Tunis. The pasha remained as a lesser figure, who nonetheless continued to be appointed from time to time by the Ottoman Porte. Within a few decades, however, the bey of Tunis added to his office the title of pasha; soon thereafter, the bey's growing power began to eclipse that of the dey. Eventually the bey of Tunis became the sole ruling authority. The beys of Tunis always kept well apart from any Ottoman attempts to compromise their political grip on power. Yet the beys as Muslim rulers were also dignified by the honor and prestige associated with the title of pasha, with its direct connection to the Ottoman Caliph, whose religious significance included being the 'Commander of the Faithful' (Arb: Amīr al-Mu'minīn).Perkins, Tunisia (Westview 1986) at 56–57.

Janissary Deys
The Ottomans first garrisoned Tunis with 4,000 janissaries taken from their occupying forces in Algiers; the troops were primarily Turkish, recruited from Anatolia. Janissary corps were under the immediate command of their Agha (Trk: "master"). The junior officers were called deys (Trk: "maternal uncle"); each dey commanded about 100 soldiers. The Ottoman Porte did not thereafter maintain the ranks of the janissaries in Tunis, but its appointed pasha for Tunisia himself began to recruit them from different regions.Perkins, Tunisia (Westview 1986) at 56.

The janissaries (yeni-cheri or "new troops") were an elite institution peculiar to the Ottoman state, though deriving from an earlier practice. Christian youth recruited through a practice called devshirme [Trk: "to collect"], often from Greece and the Balkans, were impressed into military training and compelled to convert to Islam; when mature they provided an elite corps of soldiery. Kept apart in their barracks and forbidden marriage, they were under a strict code of toilet and dress, and regimented by rules of the Hurufi sect (later the Bektashi Sufi). Begun in the 15th century as a type of slavery, the janissaries later came to enjoy privileges and could rise to high positions. A well-known symbol of their collective force was the huge kazan [Trk: "kettle"], beside which they ate and talked business. Eventually Muslims became members; the janissaries gained the right to marry and evolved into a powerful caste. They were then liable to riot and loot if not appeased, and "not less than six Sultans were either dethroned or murdered through their agency." At first a small elite of 10,000, by the 19th century when the institution was terminated, "the number on the [Ottoman] payroll had reached... over 130,000."

In the Maghrib under Ottoman control, however, the janissaries were originally Turkish or Turkish-speaking. There existed some rivalry between the janissaires and the corsairs, who were composed in large part of Christian renegades. Also the janissaries viewed with suspicion, as potential enemy combatants, the local tribal forces and the militias of the Maghrib. Called collectively the ojaq [Trk: "hearth"], the janissary corps maintained a high degree of unity and élan.Cf., Spencer, Algiers in the Age of the Corsairs (1976) at 21–22. The janissary ruling class in Algiers was strictly organized to retain power in their hands alone. Spencer here describes an aspect of their government leadership:"Authority was vested in the ocak (literally, "hearth" in Turkish) the military garrison... . Not only were native North Africans excluded from positions in the military government, but equally excluded were the kul oğlari, sons of members of the ocak by native women."

"They possessed a high sense of group solidarity and egalitarian spirit in the ranks, and elected their commander-in-chief, the agha, and a diwan [council] which protected their group interests. Being Turkish, they enjoyed a privileged position in the state: they were not subject to the regular system of justice in the regency, and were entitled to rations of bread, meat, and oil, to a regular salary, and to a proportion of the yields of piracy."Cf., Charles-André Julien, History of North Africa (Paris 1931, 1961; London 1970) at 284–285.

In Tunisia until 1591, the corps of janissaries was considered to be under the control of the local Ottoman Pasha. In 1591 janissary junior officers (deys) overthrew their senior officers; they then forced the Pasha to acknowledge the authority of one of their own men. This new leader was called the Dey, elected by his fellow deys. The Dey took charge of law and order in the capital and of military affairs, thus becoming "the virtual ruler of the country". The change defied the Ottoman Empire, although from the Tunisian perspective political power still remained under the control of foreigners. The existing state diwan (council) was dismissed, but to placate local opinion some Tunisian Maliki jurists were appointed to some key positions (yet the Ottoman Hanafi jurists still predominated). The janissary Dey enjoyed wide discretion, being quite free in the exercise his authority, yet his reach was at first limited to Tunis and other cities.

Two very effective Deys were 'Uthman Dey (1598–1610) and his son-in-law Yusuf Dey (1610–1637). Able administrators, they displayed tact, enhancing the dignity of the office. Neither being fond of luxury, treasury funds were made available for public projects and new construction (e.g., a mosque, fortress, barracks, and repair of aqueducts). Rebellious tribes were subdued. A long period of chronic social turbulence in Tunisia was brought to a close. The resulting peace and order allowed for some measure of prosperity. The Dey's ruling authority was both supported by, and relied upon, the Qaptan of the corsair fleet and the Bey who collected taxes.

Yet under Yusuf Dey, various interest groups emerged which maneuvered to outflank his ruling strategies. Many such were Tunisian, e.g., the local military, the urban notables including the disbanded diwan, and most rural tribes; also included at least to some extent was the distant sultan in Constantinople. During the 1620s and 1630s the local Turkish Bey managed to enlist these social forces, thus augmenting his authority and coming to rival the Dey, then overtaking him. That the political reign of the Dey and his janissaries had slowly evaporated was clearly demonstrated when in an attempt to regain power their uprising of 1673 failed.Jamil M. Abun-Nasr, A History of North Africa (Cambridge University 1971) at 178–179.

Corsair enterprise
Piracy may be called "an ancient if not always honorable activity" which has been practiced at different times and locations by a wide variety of peoples. A corsair (or privateer) may be distinguished from a pirate in that the former operates under explicit government authority, while the later carries no papers.The word corsair evidently derives from Italian: il corso or "the course", a reference to the act of running down a merchant ship to capture it. Cf., Spencer, Algiers in the Age of the Corsairs (1976) at 46. The Mediterranean region during the late Middle Ages and renaissance became the scene of wide-scale piracy (and privateering) practiced both by Christians (aimed more at Muslim shipping in the east) and by Muslims (more active out of the Barbary Coast in the west, with its many targets of Christian merchant ships).

The first "great age of the Barbary corsairs" occurred in the 16th century, between 1538 and 1571. Ottoman sea power in the Mediterranean was supreme during these decades, following their naval victory at the Preveza. Ottoman supremacy, however, was effectively broken at Lepanto, although Ottoman sea power remained formidable. In the early 17th century corsair activity again peaked. Thereafter Algiers began to rely more on 'tribute' from European nations in exchange for safe passage, rather than attacking merchant ships one by one. Ottoman Empire treaties with European states added a layer of conflicting diplomacy. Lastly, during the wars following the French Revolution (1789–1815), Barbary corsairs activity briefly spiked, before ending abruptly.Braudel, The Mediterranean and the Mediterranean World during the Age of Philip II (Paris 1949, 1966; New York 1973) at 873.

In 16th-century Algiers under the new Ottoman regime, the customs and practices of the pre-existing Barbary corsairs were transformed and made into impressive institutions. The activity became highly developed, with modes of recruitment, corps hierarchies, peer review, private and public financing, trades and materials support, coordinated operations, and resale and ransom markets. The policies developed in Algiers provided an exemplary model of corsair business (often called the taife reisi, or "board of captains"), a model latter followed by Tunis and by Tripoli, and independently by Morocco.Abdullah Laroui voices the common complaint that, in light of their importance, too often too much is made of the Barbary Corsairs. Larouri, The History of the Maghrib (Paris 1970; Princeton 1977), e.g., at 244.

Crews came from three sources: Christian renegades (including many famous or notorious captains), foreign Moslems (many Turkish), and a few native maghribans. Seldom did a native attain high rank, the exception being Reis Hamida a Kabyle Berber during the last years of the corsair age. Captains were selected by the ship's owners, but from a list made by a fiwan of the Riesi, an authoritative council composed of all active corsair captains. Also regulated was location of residence. "Captains, crews, and suppliers all lived in the western quarter of Algiers, along the harbor and docks."Cf., Fernand Braudel, The Mediterranean and the Mediterranean World during the Age of Philip II (Paris 1949, 1966; New York 1973) at 884, which provides a description of the foreign population (the source of renegade crews) in 16th-century Algiers, and a brief view of the city's business life, it being dependent on corsair activity.

Private capital generally supplied the funds for corsair activity. Investors essentially bought shares in a particular corsair business enterprise. Such investors came from all levels of society, e.g., merchants, officials, janissaries, shopkeepers, and artisans. The financing made money available for the capital and expenses of ship and crew, i.e., naval stores and supplies, timbers and canvas, munitions.

"Because of the potential profits to be made from corsair prizes, the underwriting of expeditions was an attractive proposition. Shareholding was organized in the same manner as that of a modern stock company, with the return to individuals dependent on their investment. This type of private investment reached its peak in the seventeenth century, the 'golden age'."

After the corsair "golden age", the state of Algiers, mainly under the control of its Turkish janissaries, came to own many of the corsair vessels and to finance many of their expeditions. Strict rules governed the division of the prizes captured at sea. First came Algiers as the state representative of Allah; next came the port authorities, the custom brokers, and those who kept the sanctuaries; then came that portion due the ship owners, and the captain and crew. The merchant cargo seized was sold "at auction or more commonly to European commercial representatives resident in Algiers, through whom it might even reach the port of its original destination."

Ransom or sale of captured prisoners (and auction of cargo) was the main source of private wealth in Algiers. Payment for captives was financed and negotiated by religious societies. The conditions of the captivity varied, most being worked as slave labor. Yet often the Muslim masters granted these Christians some religious privileges. During the early 17th century in Algiers more than 20,000 Christian prisoners were being held, coming from more than a dozen countries. "To the people of Barbary captives were a source of greater profit that looted merchandise." Yet in Tunis corsair activity never became paramount as it long remained in Algiers.Jane Soames Nickerson, A Short History of North Africa (1961) at 86: "The capture of Christian ships and the enslavement of Christian crews was not only a profitable enterprise but also a holy war against the infidel who had driven the Moors out of Spain."

Muradid Beys
The Bey (Turkish: gazi commander) in Tunisia was leading officer who "supervised the internal administration and the collection of taxes." In particular, the Bey's duties included control and collection of taxes in the tribal rural areas. Twice a year, armed expeditions (mahallas) patrolled the countryside, showing the arm of the central authority. For this purpose the Bey had organized, as an auxiliary force, rural cavalry (sipahis), mostly Arab, recruited from what came to be called "government" (makhzan) tribes.Charles-André Julien, History of North Africa (Paris 1931, 1961; London 1970) at 303–305.

Ramdan Bey had sponsored a Corsican named Murad Curso since his youth. After Ramdan's death in 1613, Murad then followed his benefactor into the office of Bey, which he exercised effectively (1613–1631). Eventually he was also named Pasha, by then a ceremonial post; yet his position as Bey remained inferior to the Dey. His son Hamuda Bey (r.1631–1666), with the support of the local notables of Tunis, acquired both titles, that of Pasha and that of Bey. By virtue of his title as Pasha, the Bey came to enjoy the social prestige of connection with the Sultan-Caliph in Constantinople. In 1640, at the death of the Dey, Hamuda Bey maneuvered to establish his control over appointments to that office. As a consequence the Bey then became supreme ruler in Tunisia.

Under Murad II Bey (reigned 1666–1675), son of Hamuda, the Diwan'' again functioned as a council of notables. Yet in 1673 the janissary deys, seeing their power ebbing, rose in revolt. During the consequent fighting, the janissaries and urban forces commanded by the deys fought against the Muradid Beys supported by largely rural forces under tribal shaykhs, and with popular support from city notables. As the Beys secured victory, so did the rural Bedouin leaders and the Tunisian notables, who also emerged triumphant. The Arabic language returned to local official use. Yet the Muradids continued to use Turkish in the central government, accentuating their elite status and Ottoman connection.

At Murad II Bey's death, internal discord within the Muradid family led to armed struggle, known as the Revolutions of Tunis or the Muradid War of Succession (1675-1705). The Turkish rulers of Algeria later intervened on behalf of one side in this struggle born of domestic conflict; these Algerian forces remained after the fighting slowed, which proved unpopular. Tunisia's unfortunate condition of civil discord and Algerian interference persisted. The last Muradid Bey was assassinated in 1702 by Ibrahim Sharif, who then ruled for several years with Algerian backing. Hence, the dynasty of the Muradid Beys may be dated from 1640 to 1702.

A gradual economic shift occurred during the Muradid era (c.1630s–1702), as corsair raiding decreased due to pressure from Europe, and commercial trading based on agricultural products (chiefly grains) increased due to an integration of the rural population into regional networks. Mediterranean trade, however, continued to be carried by European shipping companies. The Beys, in order to derive the maximum advantage from the export trade, instituted government monopolies which mediated between the local producers and foreign merchants. As a result, the rulers and their business partners (drawn from foreign-dominated elites well-connected to the Turkish-speaking ruling caste) took a disproportionate share of Tunisia's trading profits. This precluded the development of local business interests, whether rural landowners or a wealthy merchant strata. The social divide persisted, with the important families in Tunisia identified as a "Turkish" ruling caste.

Flags

See also
Turks in Tunisia
Tunisian Italians
Tunisian campaign
Tunisian navy (1705-1881)
History of Tunisia
Architecture of Tunisia
History of Africa

Reference notes

External links

Background Note: Tunisia
The World Factbook on "Tunisia"

 
States and territories established in 1574
States and territories disestablished in 1705
Tunisia
Tunisia, Ottoman
16th century in Tunisia
17th century in Tunisia
18th century in Tunisia
1574 establishments in the Ottoman Empire
1574 establishments in Africa
16th-century establishments in Tunisia
1705 disestablishments in the Ottoman Empire
1705 disestablishments in Africa
18th-century disestablishments in Tunisia
Barbary Coast